Wooly Hollow State Park is a  Arkansas state park in Faulkner County, near Greenbrier, Arkansas in the United States. The park was built and is based on a dam lake, Bennett Lake, built by the Civilian Conservation Corps (CCC) and Works Progress Administration (WPA) beginning in 1933. Access to the park is available from Arkansas Highway 285.

History
Originally, the land was a homestead by the Woolly family, and a restored cabin is on the property. The area was used by Dr. Hugh Bennett for soil studies in the 1930s. The CCC and WPA built a dam and lake, and it was used for watershed research. later named for Bennett. Before becoming a state park, the area was known as Centerville County Park.

Recreation

Cabins and camping
The park features 40 camp sites and a bathhouse.

Trails
Woolly Hollow State Park is home to the Huckleberry Trail, completed in 1935 by the CCC, the trail circles Bennett Lake. It was restored in 1981.

See also

References

State parks of Arkansas
Protected areas of Faulkner County, Arkansas
Protected areas established in 1933
Civilian Conservation Corps in Arkansas